Albert Smith (28 April 1887 – 1929) was an English professional footballer who played as a winger.

References

1887 births
1929 deaths
Footballers from Burnley
English footballers
Association football wingers
Burnley F.C. players
Bradford (Park Avenue) A.F.C. players
Rochdale A.F.C. players
Grimsby Town F.C. players
English Football League players